In Major League Soccer in the United States and Canada, the 2006 MLS Supplemental Draft, held on January 26, 2006, followed the 2006 MLS SuperDraft, as teams filled out their developmental rosters.

Round 1

Round 1 trades

Round 2

Round 2 trades
No trades reported.

Round 3

Round 3 trades

Round 4

Round 4 trades

References

Major League Soccer drafts
Supplemental Draft
MLS Supplemental Draft